California's 35th State Assembly district is one of 80 California State Assembly districts. It is currently represented by Republican Jordan Cunningham of Templeton.

District profile 
The district is located on the Central Coast and contains a mix of rocky coastlines and agricultural valleys.

Santa Barbara County - 46.6%
 Guadalupe
 Lompoc
 Santa Maria

All of San Luis Obispo County
 Arroyo Grande
 Atascadero
 Grover Beach
 Morro Bay
 Paso Robles
 Pismo Beach
 San Luis Obispo

Election results from statewide races

List of assemblymembers 
Due to redistricting, the 35th district has been moved around different parts of the state. The current iteration resulted from the 2011 redistricting by the California Citizens Redistricting Commission.

Election results 1992 - present

2020

2018

2016

2014

2012

2010

2008

2006

2004

2002

2000

1998

1996

1994

1992

See also 
 California State Assembly
 California State Assembly districts
 Districts in California

References

External links 
 District map from the California Citizens Redistricting Commission

35
Government of San Luis Obispo County, California
Government of Santa Barbara County, California
Arroyo Grande, California
Atascadero, California
Cambria, California
Lompoc, California
Morro Bay
Paso Robles, California
San Luis Obispo, California
Santa Maria, California